Elcock is a surname. Notable people with the surname include:

Ancil Elcock (born 1969), footballer from Trinidad and Tobago
Edson Elcock (born 1985), American soccer player of Trinidadian heritage
Roland Elcock VC MM (1899–1944), English recipient of the Victoria Cross
Ward Elcock, Canadian civil servant who served as the Director of the Canadian Security Intelligence Service 1994–2004
Wayne Elcock (born 1974), English boxer